Middlefield District No. 1 School is a historic school building located at Cooperstown in Otsego County, New York. It was built in 1875, and is a two-story clapboard, frame building set on a fieldstone foundation with a rear frame ell.  The main facade is five bays wide and features a projecting two-story entrance bay surmounted by a cupola containing the original school bell.  The school closed in 1954 and, since 1966, the building has been used by the Town of Middlefield Historical Association.

It was listed on the National Register of Historic Places in 1987.

References

External links
Town of Middlefield Historical Association website

School buildings on the National Register of Historic Places in New York (state)
Federal architecture in New York (state)
School buildings completed in 1875
History museums in New York (state)
Historical society museums in New York (state)
Education museums in the United States
Museums in Otsego County, New York
National Register of Historic Places in Otsego County, New York